The 1987 NCAA Division II football rankings are from the NCAA Division II football committee. This is for the 1987 season.

Legend

NCAA Division II Football Committee poll

Notes

References

Rankings
NCAA Division II football rankings